Aleksandr Anatolyevich Ivanov (born 14 April 1973) is a former Russian football player.

External links
 

1973 births
People from Kolpino
Living people
FC Zenit Saint Petersburg players
Soviet footballers
Russian footballers
Russian Premier League players
PFC Spartak Nalchik players
FC Dynamo Saint Petersburg players
Association football midfielders
FC Lokomotiv Saint Petersburg players
FC Zenit-2 Saint Petersburg players